YBG may refer to:

 Yash Birla Group, an Indian industrial conglomerate
 Yunus Brothers Group, a Pakistani conglomerate 
 The IATA code for the airport at CFB Bagotville
 Young, Black en Gifted, an album by Sunny Boy
 Ysgol Bro Gwaun, a secondary school in the town of Fishguard in north Pembrokeshire